The 2012 Formula BMW Talent Cup was the second Formula BMW Talent Cup season. The series champion received €297,500 sponsorship for 2013 in a higher-level single-seater racing series.

Drivers

Race calendar

Championship standings

References

External links 
 BMW-Motorsport.com

Formula BMW seasons
Formula BMW Talent Cup
Formula BMW Talent Cup
Formula BMW Talent Cup
BMW Talent Cup